Khalid Masud Gondal or Khalid Masood Gondal (Urdu: خالد مسعود گوندل ) is the vice-chancellor of Fatima Jinnah Medical University since July 2022. He has also served as vice-chancellor of King Edward Medical University, Lahore From June 2018 to June 2022.

Early life and career 
Khalid Masood Gondal graduated from King Edward Medical College, Lahore, Pakistan in 1986. Then he completed his fellowship in surgery in 1992. He was appointed as a professor in 2005 and later became Chairman, Department of Surgery at his alma mater King Edward Medical University, Lahore. 

He has published more than 100 research publications in national and international journals. His main interest is in the field of medical education in Pakistan. He served as first regular Vice Chancellor of Fatima Jinnah Medical University in Lahore. He has also served as the vice president College of Physicians and Surgeons Pakistan (CPSP) in 2011 and senior vice president of CPSP from 2015 to 2016. He was part of the delegation that represented CPSP in many countries including the United States, Canada, UK, Ireland, Saudi Arabia.

Awards and recognition
 Tamgha-e-Imtiaz (Medal of Excellence) Award on 23 March 2013 by the Government of Pakistan for his services in the field of medical education in Pakistan. 
 Pride of Performance Award on 23 March 2021 by the President of Pakistan for his services in the field of medical education.

References

External links

1962 births
Vice-Chancellors of the King Edward Medical University
King Edward Medical University alumni
Academic staff of King Edward Medical University
People from Mandi Bahauddin District
Pakistani surgeons
Living people
Vice-Chancellors of the Fatima Jinnah Medical University
Pakistani academics
Recipients of Tamgha-e-Imtiaz
Recipients of the Pride of Performance